, also known as Bon Voyage Yamato, is a 1979 Japanese animated television movie that was first broadcast on Fuji TV. This was the third movie in the Space Battleship Yamato saga (however, Be Forever Yamato is the third theatrical movie). The Yamato crew must defeat the new Dark Nebula Empire. This film is the first in a two-part story arc that continues in Be Forever Yamato.

Plot
During a seemingly standard training mission a month after the war with the White Comet Empire, the crew of the Yamato face a new enemy: the mysterious Dark Nebula Empire. Kodai, Shima, Yuki, and the rest of the ship's crew have to ally with ex-enemy Desslar in order to foil the Dark Nebula's plans of strip mining Iscandar - the home planet of old friend Starsha, who helped the crew during their first voyage.

Cast
Kei Tomiyama as Susumu Kodai
Shusei Nakamura as Daisuke Shima
Yoko Asagami as Yuki Mori
Akira Kimura as Great Emperor / Narrator
Ichirô Nagai as Dr. Sakezo Sado
Kazuo Hayashi as Yasuo Nanbu
Kenichi Ogata as Analyzer
Koji Nakata as Meldarz
Kouji Yada as Talan
Kousei Tomita as Deda
Makio Inoue as Tetsu Kitano
Masatō Ibu as Desler/ Heikuro Todo
Michiko Hirai as Starsha
Mikio Terashima as Sho Yamazaki
Miyuki Ueda as Starsha
Shinji Nomura as Yoshikazu Aihara
Taichirou Hirokawa as Mamoru Kodai
Takeshi Aono as Shiro Sanada
Tohru Furuya as Tasuke Tokugawa
Toshio Furukawa as Shigeru Samamoto
Yoshito Yasuhara as Kenjiro Ota
Yū Mizushima as Jiro Shima (scenes deleted)

Notes

References

External links
Official website
 
 

1970s action films
1970s science fiction films
1979 anime films
1979 television films
1979 films
Animated films based on animated series
Films set in the 23rd century
Japanese animated science fiction films
Japanese television films
1970s Japanese-language films
Japanese science fiction action films
Science fiction television films
Space Battleship Yamato films